Jan Roodzant (born January 6, 1984 in Ede, Netherlands) is an Olympic-swimmer from Aruba. He swam for Aruba at the:
2008 Olympics,
2007 World Championships, and
2006 Central American and Caribbean Games.

References

1984 births
Living people
People from Ede, Netherlands
Sportspeople from Gelderland
Aruban male swimmers
Olympic swimmers of Aruba
Swimmers at the 2008 Summer Olympics
Swimmers at the 2007 Pan American Games
Pan American Games competitors for Aruba
Dutch emigrants to Aruba